This is a list of cities in Palau.

Palau only has one true city, Koror.

Palau's towns and villages include:
1. Airai
2. Kloulklubed
3. Meyuns
4. Melekeok (The capital city/state)
5. Ngermid
6. Hatobohei
7. Ollei
8. Imetang
9. Choll
10. Elab
11. Ngebuked
12. Ngkeklau
13. Ngetbong
14. Bkulangriil
15. Ibobang
16. Bkurrengel
17. Ngerkeai
18. Southwest Islanders Village
19. Lemon Heights (Ibobang)
20. Imeong
21. Imelchol Village
22. Koska
23. Urdmang
24. Ngriil

See also
 States of Palau
 List of cities by country

Palau, List of cities in
Cities

Palau